The Good Son: The Life of Ray "Boom Boom" Mancini is a 2013 American documentary about the life of boxer Ray Mancini.

References

External links

2013 films
American sports documentary films
Documentary films about boxing
2013 documentary films
Documentary films about sportspeople
2010s English-language films
2010s American films